By Request is an album by American country music artist George Jones released in 1984 on the Epic Records label.

The album collects many of Jones's hits (including three number ones) but does not include "He Stopped Loving Her Today" which was Jones's signature hit in 1980. It features several other country stars, including the Oak Ridge Boys and Merle Haggard.  By Request also marks the first time that "We Didn't See A Thing" appeared on a Jones album, his top ten country hit with Ray Charles. The "buddy song" makes light of the blind pianist's vision impairment, something Charles had often done in the past. The two vocal giants had united to record the song for Charles's 1984 duet collaborations album, Friendship, which had been recorded in Nashville by Jones's producer Billy Sherrill.  It was the only recording the pair ever made together and features Chet Atkins on guitar.  They performed the song together on a 1984 awards show, which can be seen on YouTube.

Track listing

References

External links
 George Jones' Official Website
 Record Label

George Jones compilation albums
1984 compilation albums
Albums produced by Billy Sherrill
Epic Records compilation albums